World War II was the first war in which jet aircraft participated in combat with examples being used on both sides of the conflict during the latter stages of the war. The first successful jet aircraft, the Heinkel He 178, flew only five days before the 1 September 1939 start of the war. By the end of the conflict on 2 September 1945 Germany, the United Kingdom, and the United States all had operational turbojet-powered fighter aircraft while Japan had produced, but not used, motorjet-powered kamikaze aircraft, and had tested and ordered into production conventional jets. Italy and the Soviet Union had both tested motorjet aircraft which had turbines powered by piston engines and the latter had also equipped several types of conventional piston-powered fighter aircraft with auxiliary ramjet engines for testing purposes. Germany was the only country to use jet-powered bombers operationally during the war.

This list includes only aircraft powered by turbine engines, either on their own or as part of mixed-power arrangements. Rocket-powered aircraft are not included, nor are aircraft that only flew following the end of the war. Aircraft which were designed but not constructed are also excluded.
Production figures for aircraft used postwar include examples built after the war ended, of the same versions already flying during the war.

Aircraft

|-
! width=18%|Name !! Origin !! First flight !! Type !! Entered service !! Number built !! Notes
|-
| Arado Ar 234 || Germany ||  || Combat ||  || + || First jet bomber but used mostly for reconnaissance. Few ever flew. Night fighter tested operationally.
|-
| Bell P-59 Airacomet || US ||  || Operational ||  ||  || First USAAF jet to fly, used as trainer only.
|-
| Bell XP-83 || US ||  || Prototype || n/a ||  || Cancelled long-range escort fighter.
|-
| Caproni Campini N.1 || Italy ||  || Prototype || n/a ||  || First motorjet.
|-
| Consolidated Vultee XP-81 || US ||  || Prototype || n/a ||  || Cancelled mixed-power fighter.
|-
| Curtiss XF15C || US ||  || Prototype || n/a ||  || Cancelled mixed-power fighter.
|-
| de Havilland Vampire F.1 || UK ||  || Production ||  ||  || Only 12 produced before VE Day; no combat service.
|-
| Douglas XBTD-2 Destroyer || US ||  || Prototype || n/a ||  || Cancelled mixed-power torpedo bomber
|-
| Fieseler Fi 103R Reichenberg || Germany ||  || Operational ||  ||  || Manned V-1 flying bomb ready late 1944 but not used.
|-
| Gloster E.28/39 || UK ||  || Prototype || n/a ||  || Engine testbed and first Allied jet to fly.
|-
| Gloster Meteor F.1 & F.3 || UK ||  || Combat ||  ||  || First operational Allied jet. First jet to down another jet aircraft (a V-1 flying bomb).
|-
| Heinkel He 162 || Germany ||  || Combat ||  || + || Cheap mass-production interceptor (Volksjaeger) for use by semi-trained pilots. Little service before war over.
|-
| Heinkel He 178 || Germany ||  || Prototype || n/a ||  || First jet aircraft to fly
|-
| Heinkel He 280 || Germany ||  || Prototype || n/a ||  || First jet fighter to fly, cancelled.
|-
| Horten Ho 229 || Germany ||  || Prototype || n/a ||  || Fighter/bomber, first jet powered flying wing.
|-
| Junkers Ju 287 || Germany ||  || Prototype || n/a ||  || Testbed for multi-engine bomber design.
|-
| Lockheed P-80 Shooting Star || US ||  || Operational ||  ||  || First operational US jet fighter. Four deployed during the war, two seeing limited service in Italy, but no combat.
|-
| McDonnell FD Phantom || US ||  || Production ||  ||  || Postwar production, designation changed April 1946 to FH.
|-
| McDonnell TD2D Katydid || US ||  || Operational ||  || Unknown || US Navy pulsejet-powered target drone.
|-
| Messerschmitt Me 262 || Germany ||  || Combat ||  ||  || First operational jet fighter as fighter and fighter-bomber, with night-fighter, bomber, and reconnaissance versions trialled.
|-
| Messerschmitt Me 328 || Germany ||  (early) || Prototype || n/a ||  || Cancelled pulsejet fighter/bomber.
|-
| Mikoyan-Gurevich I-250 || USSR ||  || Prototype || n/a ||  || Mixed-power motorjet fighter.
|-
| Nakajima Kikka || Japan ||  || Prototype || n/a ||  || Jet bomber inspired by Me 262.
|-
| NAMU TD2N || US ||  || Prototype || n/a ||  || Target drone based on Gorgon III missile.
|-
| Polikarpov I-153DM || USSR ||  || Prototype || n/a ||  || Experimental mixed power ramjet fighter biplane.
|-
| Ryan FR Fireball || US ||  || Operational ||  ||  || US Navy mixed power fighter, never saw combat.
|-
| Sukhoi Su-5 || USSR ||  || Prototype || n/a ||  || Cancelled mixed power motorjet fighter.
|-
| Yakovlev Yak-7PVRD || USSR ||  (late) || Prototype || n/a ||  || Mixed-power ramjet fighter.
|-
| Yokosuka MXY7 Model 22 || Japan ||  || Production || n/a ||  || Motorjet "Ohka" Kamikaze, not used operationally.
|}

See also
List of aircraft of World War II
List of World War II military gliders
List of rotorcraft of World War II

References

Notes

Citations

Bibliography

 

 

Jet